Scottsbluff Public Schools, located in Scottsbluff, Nebraska, United States, is the largest school district in Scotts Bluff County. The district serves more than 2,600 students and has one high school, one middle school, and five elementary schools.

The current superintendent is Dr. Andrew Dick. The current school board members of SBPS are Ruth Kozal, president; Mark Lang; Scott Reisig; Lori Browning; Paul Snyder; and Beth Merrigan.

The high school's journalism department includes two publications: The Bluffs (yearbook) and The Echoes (newspaper).

The high school has recently seen recent additions including a geothermal system and a new commons area.  Lincoln Heights, Longfellow, Roosevelt, and Westmoor Elementary Schools also renovated their air conditioning and heating units, and Westmoor added several new classrooms for the '08-'09 school year.

Schools
 Scottsbluff High School
 Bluffs Middle School
 Lincoln Heights Elementary
 Longfellow Elementary
 Roosevelt Elementary
 Westmoor Elementary
 Lake Minatare Elementary

Athletics 
Scottsbluff High School is a member of the Nebraska School Activities Association and the school's teams compete in the Western Conference. The school mascot is the Bearcat.

Notable alumni
 Jack Todd (1965 graduate) - journalist, author, and conscientious objector. 

 Teresa Scanlan (2010 graduate) - Miss Nebraska 2010; Miss America 2011

References

External links
 Scottsbluff Public Schools
 Bluffs Middle School

School districts in Nebraska
Education in Scotts Bluff County, Nebraska